The women's doubles draw for the 2007 Mirage Cup.

Victoria Azarenka and Tatiana Poutchek defeated Maret Ani and Alberta Brianti in the final, 6–2, 6–4.

Seeds

 Jarmila Gajdošová /  Akiko Morigami (semifinals)
 Ekaterina Bychkova /  Emma Laine (first round)
 Natalie Grandin /  Raquel Kops-Jones (quarterfinals)
 Victoria Azarenka /  Tatiana Poutchek (champions)

Draw

Draw

Qualifying

Seeds

 Kristina Barrois /  Tatjana Malek (qualified)
 Angela Haynes /  Sandra Záhlavová (qualified)

Qualifiers

Qualifying draw

First qualifier

Second qualifier

External links
Main Draws
Qualifying Draws

Mirage Cup - Women's Doubles, 2007